Alexandre Grimaldi-Coste (born 24 August 2003) is the son of Prince Albert II of Monaco and Nicole Coste. As his parents never married, Grimaldi-Coste is not in the line of succession to the Monegasque throne.

Early life
Born Éric Alexandre Stéphane Tossoukpé on 24 August 2003 in Paris, France, his mother changed her surname to Coste on 10 November 2004. Daughter of a merchant in Togo where she grew up, his mother Nicole Coste, became a student in France when she was 17. She was a flight attendant on an Air France plane en route from the French Riviera to Paris in July 1997 when Prince Albert of Monaco, a passenger, asked for her phone number, subsequently engaging in a relationship with her for several years until, allegedly, Albert's father, Prince Rainier III, demanded that he end the affair.

Coste told Paris Match that she became pregnant only after a visit to celebrate her 31st birthday turned into a tryst. Albert provided for and visited mother and child promising, according to Coste, to legally acknowledge the child after a DNA test confirmed his paternity. When he did not do so, Coste offered the interview and photographs to the media. Albert made no public comment on media speculation, being in official mourning following the death of his father. Although he successfully sued Paris-Match for invasion of privacy, he did acknowledge paternity of the child in a statement issued by his attorney, Thierry Lacoste, on 6 July 2005. He was baptised Catholic, and his godparents are Princess Stephanie of Monaco and Thierry Lacoste. His mother later changed Alexandre's surname to Grimaldi-Coste, adding the dynastic name used by the princely family. In September 2021, Alexandre and his mother appeared in the cover of French magazine Paris Match. He and his mother were also interviewed by the magazine.

Succession issues
Out-of-wedlock children are not in the line of succession to the Monegasque throne according to Article 10 of the Constitution of Monaco, as amended 2 April 2002. A child born out of wedlock may be legitimized in Monaco: Article 226-9 of the Monegasque Civil Code specifies that "the legitimization can benefit all children born out of wedlock provided that, by voluntary acknowledgement or by court judgement, their parentage has been lawfully established with regard to their two parents". The law of the principality stipulates, however, that a child of the reigning prince born out-of-wedlock may only inherit the throne if he weds the child's mother.

On 26 October 2006, Albert II gave an interview to US television personality Larry King during which he said his two eldest children would not be in line for the Monegasque throne but that they would be taken care of financially. They are also heirs to Prince Albert II's personal fortune, estimated at more than one billion dollars: Upon joining the Council of Europe on 5 October 2004, Monaco became subject to the European Convention on Human Rights regulations on inheritance rights, in addition to its own national laws, which guarantees familial inheritance for children born out of wedlock.

References and notes

External links
BBC: Albert II confirms Alexander is his son
Article on Coste and her son 
Larry King interviews Prince Albert II

2003 births
Living people
Illegitimate children of Monegasque monarchs
Alexandre
People from Paris
Kelly family
French people of Togolese descent
French people of Monegasque descent
Sons of monarchs